George Russell Rogers (20 April 1847 – 14 December 1905) was an English cricketer.  Rogers was a right-handed batsman.  He was born at Brixton, Surrey.

Rogers made his first-class debut for Surrey against Yorkshire in 1870.  He made four further first-class appearances for Surrey in that season, the last of which came against Middlesex.  In his five first-class matches, he scored a total of 34 runs at an average of 3.77, with a high score of 18.

He died at Kensington, London on 14 December 1905.

References

External links
George Rogers at ESPNcricinfo
George Rogers at CricketArchive

1847 births
1905 deaths
People from Brixton
English cricketers
Surrey cricketers